Dahegaon may refer to:

 Dahegaon, Maharashtra, a village in Aurangabad district, Maharashtra
 Dahegaon, Komaram Bheem, a village in Komaram Bheem district, Telangana